San Carlos del Valle is a municipality in Ciudad Real, Castile-La Mancha, Spain. It has a population of 1,218.

History

Although they found traces of prehistoric civilizations, Roman, Germanic or perhaps Arabic, true origin of the town has its first data in the former chapel of Santa Elena, built in the twelfth or thirteenth century, which stood until the eighteenth century except that one wall appeared painted the venerated image of Santo Cristo del Valle.

During the sixteenth century the first permanent settlement of the town arises around this hermitage. The increase in pilgrimages to pray to Christ determined the Crown and the Council of Military Orders to build a new chapel and some dependencies to give shelter to pilgrims.

After the work during the reign of King Philip V, and resulting in a rapid increase in population, urban redevelopment, which took place, and in times of Carlos III, Pablo de Olavide became necessary. Later, in December 1800, King Charles IV issued a Royal Charter privilege with which dictated the independence of San Carlos del Valle and became independent and autonomous municipality as it is today.

Church of San Carlos del Valle

Located in Castilla la Mancha, this baroque church built between 1613 and 1729 with close resemblance to the Basilica of St. Peter in Rome, has four towers each crowned with a typical Madrid spire and a central dome high height of over 28 meters inside, topped with a very high acute arrow spire that reaches 47 meters from the ground. In 1993 the temple was declared a national monument of cultural interest.

Municipalities in the Province of Ciudad Real